was a Japanese screenwriter and film director. He was born in Kobe and grew up in Yokohama. After leaving school, he began training to become a doctor but dropped out of medical school to take up a career in films. In 1948 he became an assistant director at Shochiku studios. With the support of Keisuke Kinoshita, he also began writing film scripts. His first filmed script was Kojo no tsuki, based on the song "Kōjō no Tsuki", filmed in 1954. In 1955 he married actress Hideko Takamine. He made his debut as a director with a film called Na mo naku mazushiku utsukushiku in 1961. He continued to work as a scriptwriter for films like Proof of the Man as well as a director. He also wrote the lyrics for a song "Ippon no enpitsu" for Hibari Misora.

Selected filmography

References

External links

1925 births
2016 deaths
Japanese film directors
People from Kobe